Gültepe, formerly Gedikli, is a village in the District of Haymana, Ankara Province, Turkey.

The village is populated by the Kurdish Şêxbizin tribe.

References

Villages in Haymana District

Kurdish settlements in Ankara Province